Lincoln Theodore Monroe Andrew Perry (May 30, 1902 – November 19, 1985), better known by the stage name Stepin Fetchit, was an American vaudevillian, comedian, and film actor of Jamaican and Bahamian descent, considered to be the first black actor to have a successful film career. His highest profile was during the 1930s in films and on stage, when his persona of Stepin Fetchit was billed as the "Laziest Man in the World".

Perry parlayed the Fetchit persona into a successful film career, becoming the first black actor to earn $1 million. He was also the first black actor to receive featured screen credit in a film.

Perry's film career slowed after 1939 and nearly stopped altogether after 1953. Around that time, Black Americans began to see his Stepin Fetchit persona as an embarrassing and harmful anachronism, echoing negative stereotypes. However, the Stepin Fetchit character has undergone a re-evaluation by some scholars in recent times, who view him as an embodiment of the trickster archetype.

Early life
Little is known about Perry's background other than that he was born in Key West, Florida, to West Indian immigrants. He was the second child of Joseph Perry, a cigar maker from Jamaica (although some sources indicate the Bahamas) and Dora Monroe, a seamstress from Nassau, The Bahamas. Both of his parents came to the United States in the 1890s, where they married.  By 1910, the family had moved north to Tampa, Florida. Another source says he was adopted when he was 11 years old and taken to live in Montgomery, Alabama.

His mother wanted him to be a dentist, so Perry was adopted by a quack dentist, for whom he blacked boots before running away at age 12 to join a carnival. He earned his living for a few years as a singer and tap dancer.

Vaudeville career
In his teens, Perry became a comic character actor. By the age of 20, Perry had become a vaudeville artist and the manager of a traveling carnival show. His stage name was a contraction of "step and fetch it". His accounts of how he adopted the name varied, but generally he claimed that it originated when he performed a vaudeville act with a partner. Perry won money betting on a racehorse named "Step and Fetch It", and his partner and he decided to adopt the names "Step" and "Fetchit" for their act. When Perry became a solo act, he combined the two names, which later became his professional name.

Film career

Perry played comic-relief roles in a number of films, all based on his character known as the "Laziest Man in the World". In his personal life, he was highly literate and had a concurrent career writing for The Chicago Defender. He signed a five-year studio contract following his performance in the film, In Old Kentucky (1927). The film's plot included a romantic connection between Perry and actress Carolynne Snowden, a subplot that was a rarity for black actors appearing in a white film during this era. Perry also starred in Hearts in Dixie (1929), one of the first studio productions to boast a predominantly black cast.

Jules Bledsoe provided Perry's singing voice for his role as Joe in the 1929 version of Show Boat. Fetchit did not sing "Ol' Man River", but he did sing "The Lonesome Road" in the film. In 1930, Hal Roach signed him to a film contract to appear in nine Our Gang episodes in 1930 and 1931.  However, his only appearance in the series was in A Tough Winter. Perry's contract was cancelled for unknown reasons after its release.

Perry was good friends with fellow comic actor Will Rogers. They appeared together in David Harum (1934), Judge Priest (1934), Steamboat 'Round the Bend (1935), and The County Chairman (1935).

By the mid-1930s, Perry was the first black actor to become a millionaire. He appeared in 44 films between 1927 and 1939. In 1940, Perry temporarily stopped appearing in films, having been frustrated by his unsuccessful attempt to get equal pay and billing with his white costars. He returned in 1945, in part due to financial need, though he only appeared in eight films between 1945 and 1953. He declared bankruptcy in 1947, stating assets of $146 (equal to about $ today) He returned to vaudeville; he appeared at the Anderson Free Fair in 1949 alongside Singer's Midgets. He became a friend of heavyweight boxing champion Muhammad Ali in the 1960s, allegedly converting to the Nation of Islam shortly before. (Other sources have said he was a lifelong Catholic.)

After 1953, Perry appeared in cameos in the made-for-television movie Cutter (1972) and the feature films Amazing Grace (1974) and Won Ton Ton, the Dog Who Saved Hollywood (1976). He found himself in conflict during his career with civil rights leaders who criticized him personally for the film roles that he portrayed. In 1968, CBS aired the hour-long documentary Black History: Lost, Stolen, or Strayed, written by Andy Rooney (for which he received an Emmy Award) and narrated by Bill Cosby, which criticized the depiction of black people in American film, and especially singled out Stepin Fetchit for criticism. After the show aired, Perry unsuccessfully sued CBS and the documentary's producers for defamation of character.

Music composition 
In late November 1963, Perry collaborated with Motown Records founder Berry Gordy Jr. and Esther Gordy Edwards in composing "May What He Lived for Live," a song intended to honor the memory of President John F. Kennedy in the wake of his assassination. Perry was credited under the pseudonym W.A. Bisson. The song was recorded in December 1963 by Liz Lands, who in 1968 performed the work at the funeral of the Rev. Martin Luther King Jr.

Death
Perry suffered a stroke in 1976, ending his acting career; he then moved into the Motion Picture & Television Country House and Hospital. He died on November 19, 1985, from pneumonia and heart failure, at the age of 83. He was buried at Calvary Cemetery in East Los Angeles following a Catholic funeral Mass.

Legacy
Perry spawned imitators, such as Willie Best ("Sleep 'n Eat") and Mantan Moreland, the scared, wide-eyed manservant of Charlie Chan. Perry had actually played a manservant in the Charlie Chan series before Moreland in 1935's Charlie Chan in Egypt.

Perry appeared in one 1930 Our Gang short subject, A Tough Winter, at the end of the 1929–30 season. Perry signed a contract to star with the gang in nine films for the 1930–31 season and be part of the Our Gang series, but for some unknown reason, the contract fell through, and the gang continued without Perry. Previous to Perry entering films, the Our Gang shorts had employed several black child actors, including Allen Hoskins, Jannie Hoskins, Ernest Morrison, and Eugene Jackson. In the sound Our Gang era, black actors Matthew Beard and Billie Thomas were featured. The black performers' personas in Our Gang shorts were the polar opposites of Perry's persona.

In the 2005 book Stepin Fetchit: The Life and Times of Lincoln Perry, African-American critic Mel Watkins argued that the character of Stepin Fetchit was not truly lazy or simple-minded, but instead a prankster who deliberately tricked his White employers so that they would do the work instead of him. This technique, which developed during American slavery, was referred to as "putting on old massa", and it was a kind of con art with which Black audiences of the time would have been familiar.

Awards and honors 
Fetchit has a star on the Hollywood Walk of Fame.

In 1976, despite popular aversion to his character, the Hollywood chapter of the NAACP awarded Perry a special NAACP Image Award. Two years later, he was inducted into the Black Filmmakers Hall of Fame.

Personal life
In 1929, Perry married Dorothy Stevenson. She gave birth to their son, Jemajo, on September 12, 1930. In 1931, Dorothy filed for divorce, stating that Perry had broken her nose, jaw, and arm with "his fists and a broomstick." A few weeks after their divorce was granted, Dorothy told a reporter she hoped someone would "just beat the devil out of him," as he had done to her. When Dorothy contracted tuberculosis in 1933, Perry moved her to Arizona for treatment. She died in September 1934.

Perry reportedly married Winifred Johnson in 1937, but no record of their union has been found. On May 21, 1938, Winifred gave birth to a son, Donald Martin Perry. Their relationship ended soon after Donald's birth. According to Winifred's brother, Stretch Johnson, their father intervened after Perry knocked Winifred down the stairs and broke her nose. In 1941, Perry was arrested after Winifred filed a suit for child support. When he was released from jail, he told reporters, "Winnie and I were never married. It was all a publicity stunt. I want you and everybody else to know that that is not my baby. Winnie knows the baby isn't mine but she's trying to be smart." Winifred admitted that they were not legally married, but she insisted Perry was her son's father. The court ruled in her favor and ordered Perry to pay $12 a week (almost $220 in 2020 dollars) for the child's support. Donald later took his stepfather's surname, Lambright.

Perry married Bernice Sims on October 15, 1951. Although they separated by the mid-1950s, they remained married for the rest of their lives. Bernice died on January 9, 1985.

For most of his life, Perry was a devout Catholic, but he allegedly became a member of the Nation of Islam in the early 1960s, following the footsteps of his close friends Muhammad Ali and Malcolm X, even appearing in the 1977 movie Muhammad Ali, the Greatest. (Other sources have said he was a lifelong Catholic.)

Filmography

The Mysterious Stranger (1925)
In Old Kentucky (1927) – Highpockets
The Devil's Skipper (1928) – Slave's Husband
Nameless Men (1928)
The Tragedy of Youth (1928) – Porter
The Kid's Clever (1929) – Negro Man
The Ghost Talks (1929) – Christopher Lee
Hearts in Dixie (1929) – Gummy
Show Boat (1929) – Joe
Thru Different Eyes (1929) – Janitor
Innocents of Paris (1929) – Bit Role (uncredited)
Fox Movietone Follies of 1929 (1929) – Swifty
Salute (1929) – Smoke Screen
Big Time (1929) – Eli
Cameo Kirby (1930) – Croup
The Big Fight (1930) – Spot
Swing High (1930) – Sam
La Fuerza del Querer (1930) – Spot
A Tough Winter (1930, Short) – Stepin
The Prodigal (1931) – Hokey
Wild Horse (1931) – Stepin
The Galloping Ghost (1931) – Baxter College Locker Room Attendant
Neck and Neck (1931) – The Hustler
Carolina (1934) – Scipio
David Harum (1934) – Sylvester Swifty
Stand Up and Cheer! (1934) – Stepin Fetchit
The World Moves On (1934) – Dixie
Judge Priest (1934) – Jeff Poindexter
Marie Galante (1934) – 'Pacific Gardens' Waiter (uncredited)
Bachelor of Arts (1934) – Bulga
The Littlest Rebel (1935)
Helldorado (1935) – Ulysses
The County Chairman (1935) – Sass
One More Spring (1935) – Zoo Attendant
Charlie Chan in Egypt (1935) – Snowshoes
Hot Tip (1935) – Cook
Steamboat Round the Bend (1935) – Jonah
The Virginia Judge (1935) – Spasm Johnson
36 Hours to Kill (1936) – Flash
Dimples (1936) – Cicero
On the Avenue (1937) – Herman
Love Is News (1937) – Penrod
Fifty Roads to Town (1937) – Percy
Super-Sleuth (1937) – (uncredited)
His Exciting Night (1938) – Casper, the Baker Butler
Zenobia (1939) – Zero
Open the Door Richard (1945)
Big Timers (1945, Short) – Porter / Specialty Act
Swingtime Jamboree (1946)
I Ain't Gonna Open That Door (1947, Short) – Richard
Miracle in Harlem (1948) – 'Swifty', the Handyman
Harlem Follies of 1949 (1950)
Bend of the River (1952) – Adam
The Sun Shines Bright (1953) – Jeff Poindexter
Inquiring Nuns (1968, interviewee)
Cutter (1972, TV movie) – Shoeshine Man
Muhammad Ali, the Greatest (1974)
Amazing Grace (1974, cameo appearance) – Cousin Lincoln
Brother, Can You Spare a Dime? (1975, archival footage)
Won Ton Ton, the Dog Who Saved Hollywood (1976, cameo appearance) – Dancing Butler (final film role)

See also

Amos 'n' Andy
Jar Jar Binks
Blackface
Buckwheat, a character played by Billie Thomas in the 1930s U.S. short film series Our Gang
Dudley Dickerson
Billy Kersands
"Old Aunt Jemima"
Pickaninny
Fred Toones
Uncle Tom

Notes

References

Sources

External links
 Stepin Fetchit at TCM Movie Database

Stepin Fetchit at Virtual History
 

1902 births
1985 deaths
20th-century American male actors
Male actors from Florida
African-American Catholics
American male film actors
American people of Bahamian descent
American actors of Jamaican descent
Burials at Calvary Cemetery (Los Angeles)
Deaths from pneumonia in California
People from Key West, Florida
Vaudeville performers
Vee-Jay Records artists
Catholics from Florida
Former Nation of Islam members
20th-century African-American people